Felidhoo (Dhivehi: ފެލިދޫ) is one of the inhabited islands of Vaavu Atoll in the Maldives.

Geography
The island has a reef on either side, Masfalhi Falhu to the north and Saalanfalhu to the south.

Demography

Healthcare
Felidhoo has a pharmacy.

References

Populated places in the Maldives
Islands of the Maldives